The Ostseestadion is the home stadium of FC Hansa Rostock, a German association football club, located in the city of Rostock. It has a capacity of 29,000.

"Ostseestadion" translates in English to "Baltic Sea Stadium", and is named after the Baltic Sea, whose coast Rostock lies upon. Ostseestadion is the original name of the stadium, but on 2 July 2007, Hansa Rostock sold the naming rights for the following 10 years to Deutsche Kreditbank (DKB), hence the new official name became "DKB Arena". In 2015, the club announced that the stadium was to regain its original name, and that the DKB had allowed an early renaming of the stadium and agreed to end the naming contract in advance.

Location

The Ostseestadion is located in the German city of Rostock in the state of Mecklenburg-Vorpommern. Within Rostock, it is situated not far from the city centre in the Hansaviertel part of town near several hospitals of the University of Rostock and a small forest called Barnstorfer Wald'''. Moreover, an ice hockey stadium as well as several training pitches of Hansa Rostock are just adjacent to the Ostseestadion.

The stadium can be reached easily from all parts of Rostock by public transport, using buses (stop Ostseestadion) or the S-Bahn (stop Holbeinplatz''). Public transport is free with a valid ticket for a home match three hours before and two hours after the actual match.

History
The stadium was newly built in 2001 on the site of a former stadium built in 1954. At the end of the 1960s a new 700 lux lighting system was added, which is still in use today.

Seating

The total capacity of 29,000 places includes 1000 "business seats" as well as a standing capacity of 9,000. During international matches the 9,000 standing places can be turned into 5,000 seats thus allowing for an audience of 25,000. Moreover, there are 26 business lounges for premium partners and sponsors.

Internationals

Gallery

References

External links

 http://www.dkb-arena-rostock.de official page
 http://www.fc-hansa.de F.C. Hansa Rostock club page

Football venues in East Germany
Football venues in Germany
FC Hansa Rostock
Buildings and structures in Rostock
Sports venues in Mecklenburg-Western Pomerania
Tourist attractions in Rostock
Sport in Rostock